The 2021 European Para Taekwondo Championships, was the 6th edition of the tournament, and took place on 23 September 2021.

Medal table

Medalists
The medalists per event were as follows:

Men's

Women's

References

Para European Championships
Para Taekwondo Championships
Taekwondo in Turkey
Para European Taekwondo